The 2014 Vancouver municipal election took place on November 15, 2014, the same day as other municipalities and regional districts in British Columbia selected their new municipal governments. As with previous elections, voters elected one mayor, 10 councillors, nine school board trustees, and seven park board commissioners through plurality-at-large voting. Voters also voted on whether to approve a capital budget.

Outcome
Incumbent Mayor Gregor Robertson sought re-election with the Vision Vancouver Party, which swept the 2011 election when it elected him and all of the party's city council, park board and school board candidates. In this election, Robertson was re-elected as mayor; however, Vision representation decreased with only six councillors, four school trustees, and one park board commissioner elected. In total, ten Vision candidates were not elected, including five incumbent candidates: one councillor, three school trustees, and one park board commissioner.

The Non-Partisan Association (NPA) came into the election as the second largest party in Vancouver, with two city councillors, two park board commissioners, and one school trustee. Their mayoral candidate was journalist Kirk LaPointe who lost to Robertson in the mayoral race by 10,086 votes. The NPA team gained ground electing three councillors, four park board commissioners, and four school trustees.

The Vancouver Green Party sought to improve on its 2011 results which saw the first-ever Green Party city councillor, Adriane Carr, elected. Carr was re-elected as councillor and was actually the councillor elected with the most votes at 74,077. Additionally, two park board commissioners and one school board trustee were elected, giving the Green Party of Vancouver its best result in the history of Vancouver municipal elections.

The Coalition of Progressive Electors (COPE), which officially cut ties with former ally Vision Vancouver in 2012, lost its only elected official when school trustee Allan Wong switched from COPE to Vision Vancouver on December 8, 2013, ending decades of COPE representation in the city. COPE contested this election with its first mayoral candidate since 2002, community organizer and former NDP candidate Meena Wong. The party also had candidates for every council seat. Wong placed third in the mayoral race, and no COPE candidates were elected.

New Party Vancouver 1st ran a slate of candidates for all offices. These included Olympic bronze medal winning swimmer Brent Hayden as a park board commissioner candidate, and two incumbent school board trustees Ken Denike, and Sophia Woo, who had been expelled from the NPA in June. However, no candidates from Vancouver 1st were elected.

Nominations for the 2014 vote opened on September 30, 2014, and closed on October 10, 2014. Vancouver uses an at-large election system for all elected positions; the ten candidates with most citywide votes are elected as councillors.

Just before 8:00 P.M. on election day, voting hours were extended by 45 minutes at four locations because of ballot shortages earlier in the day due to high voter turnout.

Political parties
This is a list of political parties who ran candidates in the 2014 election:

Candidates and results
The nomination period officially opened on September 30, 2014, and closed on October 10, 2014.

(I) denotes incumbents.

Mayor
Ten candidates sought election to the position of mayor; four were affiliated with a political party and six were independents. Incumbent mayor Gregor Robertson of Vision Vancouver was re-elected for a third straight term.

City councillors
Ten councillors were elected from forty-nine candidates. Of the candidates, thirty-nine were affiliated with a political party; ten were independent. All ten incumbent councillors sought re-election: seven from Vision Vancouver, two from the NPA, and one from the Green Party. NPA candidate Melissa De Genova and Vision candidate Niki Sharma were both sitting Park Board commissioners from their respective parties. Of the ten elected councillors, six were from Vision, three were from the NPA, and one was from the Green Party.

Park Board commissioners
Seven commissioners were elected from thirty-one candidates. Of the candidates, twenty-five were affiliated with a political party; six were independent. Two incumbent commissioners sought re-election: one from Vision Vancouver and one from the NPA. Of the elected commissioners, four were from the NPA, two were from the Green Party, and one was from Vision Vancouver.

School Board trustees
Nine school board trustees were elected out of twenty-eight candidates. Of the candidates, twenty-three were affiliated with a political party, and five were independent. All nine incumbent trustees sought re-election: six from Vision Vancouver (including Allan Wong, who was elected in 2011 as part of COPE, but crossed the floor to Vision Vancouver in 2013), one from the NPA, and two ex-NPA trustees: Ken Denike, and Sophia Woo, who were running for new party Vancouver 1st after being expelled by the NPA in June 2014. Vision and the NPA each had four candidates elected, while the Green Party had one.

Capital plan questions
The proposed budget for 2015–2018 was $1.085 billion, of which $235 million would be borrowed, requiring electoral approval.

Voters were asked the following three questions:

1. Are you in favour of Council having the authority, without further assent of the electors, to pass bylaws between January 1, 2015, and December 31, 2018, to borrow an aggregate $58,200,000 for the following purposes? 
Parks at $17,950,000
Recreational and exhibition facilities at $40,250,000

2. Are you in favour of Council having the authority, without further assent of the electors, to pass bylaws between January 1, 2015, and December 31, 2018, to borrow an aggregate $95,700,000 for the following purposes?
Public safety facilities at $22,250,000
Street and bridge infrastructure at $56,450,000
Street lighting, traffic signals, and communications systems at $17,000,000

3. Are you in favour of Council having the authority, without further assent of the electors, to pass bylaws between January 1, 2015, and December 31, 2018, to borrow an aggregate $81,100,000 for the following purposes?
Community facilities at $59,750,000
Civic facilities and infrastructure at $21,350,000

Voter and party statistics

Voter turnout
Of the 411,741 registered voters, there were 181,707 recorded ballots, putting the voter turnout at 44.13%.  This was an increase from the 34.57% turnout during the previous municipal election in 2011.

Elected percentage by party

Seat changes by party

Opinion polls

References

2014 elections in Canada
Municipal elections in Vancouver
2014 in British Columbia